Psychological resistance, also known as psychological resistance to change, is the phenomenon often encountered in clinical practice in which patients either directly or indirectly exhibit paradoxical opposing behaviors in presumably a clinically initiated push and pull of a change process. In other words, the concept of psychological resistance is that patients are likely to resist physician suggestions to change behavior or accept certain treatments regardless of whether that change will improve their condition. It impedes the development of authentic, reciprocally nurturing experiences in a clinical setting. It is established that the common source of resistances and defenses is shame. This and similar negative attitudes may be the result of social stigmatization of a particular condition, such as psychological insulin resistance towards treatment of diabetes.

Examples of psychological resistance may include perfectionism, criticizing, disrespectful attitude, being self-critical, preoccupation with appearance, social withdrawal, need to be seen as independent and invulnerable, or an inability to accept compliments or constructive criticism.

Psychoanalytic origins 

The discovery of resistance was central to Sigmund Freud's theory of psychoanalysis: for Freud, the theory of repression is the cornerstone on which the whole structure of psychoanalysis rests, and all his accounts of its discovery "are alike in emphasizing the fact that the concept of repression was inevitably suggested by the clinical phenomenon of resistance". Freud's theory established psychological resistance as a passive, unconscious process. It inherently places blame on patients for the inability to accept proper treatment as an avoidance measure.  It failed to consider patients having deliberate, conscious concerns relating to treatment that is driving their psychological resistance. This is known as realistic resistance.

Contemporary understandings 
Realistic Resistance

Realistic resistance is the understanding of the conscious and deliberate aspect of psychological resistance in therapeutic treatment. "Realistic resistance refers to clients’ conscious, deliberate opposition to therapeutic initiatives that they fail to understand or accept". There are several things an individual may disagree with in the therapy setting that can lead to realistic psychological resistance, such as general therapeutic technique or words and phrases utilized by a physician or therapist.

Realistic resistance can be identified by behavioral markers. Some examples include avoidance of certain lines of questioning, outright refusal to cooperate, and sudden loss of effort and interest during sessions.

Interpersonal resistance
Resistance is based on instinctively autonomous ways of reacting in which clients both reveal and keep hidden aspects of themselves from the therapist or another person. These behaviors occur mostly during therapy, in interaction with the therapist. It is a way of avoiding and yet expressing unacceptable drives, feelings, fantasies, and behavior patterns.

Examples of causes of resistance include: resistance to the recognition of feelings, fantasies, and motives; resistance to revealing feelings toward the therapist; resistance as a way of demonstrating self-sufficiency; resistance as clients' reluctance to change their behavior outside the therapy room; resistance as a consequence of failure of empathy on the part of the therapist.

Examples of the expression of resistance are canceling or rescheduling appointments, avoiding consideration of identified themes, forgetting to complete homework assignments, and the like. This will make it more difficult for the therapist to work with the client, but it will also provide him with information about the client.

State and trait resistance (situational and characteristic)
Resistance is an automatic and unconscious process. According to Van Denburg and Kiesler, it can be either for a certain period of time (state resistance) but it can also be a manifestation of more longstanding traits or character (trait resistance).

In psychotherapy, state resistance can occur at a certain moment, when an anxiety-provoking experience is triggered. Trait resistance, on the other hand, repeatedly occurs during sessions and interferes with the task of therapy. The client shows a pattern of off-task behaviors that makes the therapist experience some level of negative emotion and cognition against the client. Therefore the maladaptive pattern of interpersonal behavior and the therapist's response interfere with the task or process of therapy. This ‘state resistance' is cumulative during sessions and its development can best be prevented by empathic interventions on the therapist's part.

Outside therapy, trait resistance in a client is demonstrated by distinctive patterns of interpersonal behavior, which are often caused by typical patterns of communication with significant others, like family, friends, and partners.

Handling resistance in psychotherapy
Nowadays many therapists work with resistance as a way to understand the client better. They emphasize the importance to work with the resistance and not against it. This is because working against the resistance of a client can result in a counterproductive relationship with the therapist; the more attention is drawn to the resistance, the less productive the therapy. Working with the resistance provides a positive working relationship and gives the therapist information about the unconscious of the client.

A therapist can use countertransference as a tool to understand the client's resistance. The feelings the client evokes in the therapist with his/her resistance will give you a hint what the resistance is about. For example, a very directive client can make the therapist feel very passive. When the therapist pays attention to their passive feelings, it can make him/her understand this behavior of the client as resistance coming from fear of losing control.

It can also be useful to identify resistance with the client.  This can not only work towards addressing the issue but can also allow the client to think about and discuss their resistance and the cognitive processes that underlie it. In this way, the client takes an active involvement in their therapy, which may reduce resistance in the future.  It also helps the client's ability to identify their resistance in the future and respond to it.

Relevant to the question of treatment planning are research studies that have looked at resistance traits as indicators and contra-indicators for different types of interventions. Beutler, Moleiro, and Talebi reviewed 20 studies that inspected the differential effects of therapist directiveness as moderated by client resistance and found that 80% (n=16) of the studies demonstrated that directive interventions were most productive among clients who had relatively low levels of state or trait-like resistance. In contrast, nondirective interventions worked best among clients who had relatively high levels of resistance. These findings provide strong support for the value of resistance level as a predictor of treatment outcome, as well as treatment-planning. In these studies cognitive behavioral therapy has been used as a prototype for directive therapy and psychodynamic, self-directed, or other relation oriented therapy have been used as a prototype for non-directive treatment.

Behavioral models of resistance 

Behavior analytic and social learning models of resistance focus on the setting events, antecedents, and consequences for resistant behavior to understand the function of the behavior. At least five behavioral models of resistance exist. These models share many common features. The most explored research model, with more than ten years of support, is the model created by Gerald Patterson for resistance in parent training. With supporting research, this model has even been extended to consultation. 

Patterson's suggested intervention of 'struggle with and work through' is often contrasted as an intervention with motivational interviewing. In motivational interviewing, the therapist does not attempt to prompt the client back to the problem area but reinforces the occurrence when it comes up as opposed to 'struggling with and working through' where the therapist directly guides the client back to the problem. Behavior analytic models can accommodate both interventions, as pointed out by Cautilli and colleagues depending on the function and what needs to be accomplished in the treatment.

See also 

 Decisional balance sheet
 Immunity to change
 Motivational salience
 Negative therapeutic reaction
 Psychological dependence
 Resistance (creativity)

References 

Interpersonal conflict
Defence mechanisms
Psychoanalytic terminology
Freudian psychology